The 20th Sarasaviya Awards festival (Sinhala: 20වැනි සරසවිය සම්මාන උලෙළ), presented by the Associated Newspapers of Ceylon Limited, was held to honor the best films of 1991 Sinhala cinema on April 11, 1992, at the Bandaranaike Memorial International Conference Hall, Colombo 07, Sri Lanka. President Ranasinghe Premadasa was the chief guest at the awards night.

The film Kelimadala won the most awards with thirteen including Best Film.

Awards

References

Sarasaviya Awards
Sarasaviya